Denis Foley (14 May 1934 – 26 October 2013) was an Irish Fianna Fáil politician who served as a Teachta Dála (TD) for the Kerry North constituency from 1981 to 1989 and 1992 to 2002 and a Senator for the Industrial and Commercial Panel from 1989 to 1992.

A former rates collector, in the 1970s, Foley successfully ran The Central Ballroom in Ballybunion and the ballroom of The Brandon Hotel. He also had an interest in The Hillgrove Hotel in Dingle at one stage, and had extensive property holdings in Tralee.

Foley was a member of Kerry County Council from 1979, and was first elected to Dáil Éireann at the 1981 general election. He retained his seat through three general elections until his defeat at the 1989 general election by party rival Tom McEllistrim (who, unlike Foley, was a supporter of the then leader of Fianna Fáil, Charles Haughey). He was then elected to the 19th Seanad as a Senator for the Industrial and Commercial Panel, and regained his Dáil seat at the 1992 general election, holding it until he retired at the 2002 general election. His daughter, Norma, unsuccessfully sought the Fianna Fáil nomination to contest the seat in 2002; she was selected for the 2007 general election, but did not win a seat. She stayed in local politics, but won a seat in the Dáil at the 2020 general election for the Kerry constituency.

Following revelations that he had held an offshore account with Ansbacher Bank to avoid tax, Denis Foley resigned from Fianna Fáil on 9 February 2000, becoming an Independent TD. He had previously resigned from the Dáil Public Accounts Committee (on which he had been involved in the questioning of an official of the Ansbacher bank in which he held an undeclared deposit) and in May 2000, he became the first TD to receive a penalty for breaching the Ethics in Public Office Act 1995; he was suspended from the Dáil for 14 days.

He died on 26 October 2013.

See also
Deposit interest retention tax

References

 

 

1934 births
2013 deaths
Fianna Fáil senators
Fianna Fáil TDs
Independent TDs
Irish hoteliers
Local councillors in County Kerry
Members of the 22nd Dáil
Members of the 23rd Dáil
Members of the 24th Dáil
Members of the 25th Dáil
Members of the 19th Seanad
Members of the 27th Dáil
Members of the 28th Dáil
Tax collectors